Lyngdal Church may refer to:

Lyngdal Church (Agder), a church in the municipality of Lyngdal in Agder county, Norway
Lyngdal Church (Viken), a church in the municipality of Flesberg in Viken county, Norway